Scheutjens–Fleer theory is a lattice-based self-consistent field theory that is the basis for many computational analyses of polymer adsorption.

References 
 Polymers at Interfaces by G.J. Fleer, M.A. Cohen Stuart, J.M.H.M. Scheutjens, T. Cosgrove, B. Vincent. 

Polymer chemistry
Solutions
Thermodynamics
Statistical mechanics